The Government College of Technology, Samanabad, Faisalabad (GCT Faislaabad) is a public college located in Faisalabad, Punjab, Pakistan. It was established in 1966 as Government Polytechnic Institute and upgraded as Government College of Technology in 1981.

Academics

Diploma of Associate Engineering (DAE) programs
The college offers following three-year Diploma of Associate Engineering (DAE) programs:

 Civil technology
 Electrical technology
 Food technology
 Instrumentation technology
 Mechanical technology
 Mechanical (power) technology specialization in auto and farm machinery technology
 Textile dying and printing technology
 Two years diploma in culinary arts

Bachelor's program
The college also offers following bachelor's degree program:

BSc Electrical engineering technology

See also
Jinnah Polytechnic Institute, Faisalabad

References

External links
 GCT Faisalabad official website

Universities and colleges in Faisalabad District
Educational institutions established in 1966
1966 establishments in Pakistan
Vocational education in Pakistan
Faisalabad